BH Telecom is a Bosnian telecommunications company, headquartered in Sarajevo, Bosnia and Herzegovina.

History
It was established during the collapse of Yugoslavia in 1992 and was the first company in Bosnia and Herzegovina to provide GSM, 3G, IPTV and many other services. It was a government-owned corporation whose sole proprietor was Federation of Bosnia and Herzegovina, but since 2004 it is listed as a public company with most stock still owned by the government. Although stock owners have both governance and ownership rights, the effect of such controlled distribution of capital is that company is effectively still directed and managed by the government, but funds and small shareholders are enabled to earn money on dividends and stock trading.

Company profile
The General Directorate of the company is located in Sarajevo. The seven regional BH Telecom directorates are located on the territory of the whole Bosnia and Herzegovina, having their main offices in Sarajevo, Tuzla, Zenica, Mostar, Bihać, Travnik, Brčko and Goražde. The company also includes the tenth-biggest organizational unit in Bosnia and Herzegovina - Telecom Inženjering, with its main office in Sarajevo.

The company has been significantly characterized by: annual profit over 40 million euro a developed technological infrastructure in all networks and own human and professional potentials.

Users of services of either fixed or mobile network of BH Telecom Sarajevo have been enabled to have a high quality telephony in local, toll and international traffic.

At the end of 2003, BH Telecom Sarajevo had 454 installed switches (98 HOSTs and 356 Remote Units, with totally 648.527 installed connections), having 86.3% digitalization. Transmission system of the company had 100% digitalization.

IN node was put into operation in 2003, allowing provision of new services to users.

Extending its Global System for Mobile Communications (GSM) system and increasing the number of base stations in 2003, BH Telecom Sarajevo provided its users with better coverage of the BiH territory with GSM signal, and with even better quality of services than before. (Totally 346 BSs installed).

BH Telecom Sarajevo enabled its BIHNET users to have access to Internet via public switched telephone network, leased lines and ADSL access. In 2003 the company began with a major introduction of broadband technology, so, accordingly, ADSL service was at disposal to users in FBIH.

In May 2013, BH Telecom started testing and implementing 4G technology. In April 2019 BH Telecom released LTE-A (telecommunication)4G+ commercially in most major cities in Bosnia and Herzegovina.

In April 2022, the US Treasury added Bosnian MP Asim Sarajlić to the Specially Designated Nationals List under Executive Order 14033, noting in the reasoning that, among other things, "Sarajlic has also abused his position in relation to BH Telecom, a large BiH state-owned enterprise. In this capacity, Sarajlic personally accepted from payment from job applicants in exchange for positions, and otherwise exerted inordinate influence over the hiring process. As part of this activity, Sarajlic recommended candidates who were reportedly severely underqualified, undermining the integrity of the company."

See also
 List of companies of Bosnia and Herzegovina

References

External links 
 BH Telecom

Telecommunications companies of Bosnia and Herzegovina
Internet service providers of Bosnia and Herzegovina
Companies based in Sarajevo
Telecommunications companies established in 1997
1997 establishments in Bosnia and Herzegovina
Brands of Bosnia and Herzegovina
Government-owned companies of Bosnia and Herzegovina
Government-owned telecommunications companies